Peter A. Vellucci (1942/43 – August 4, 2014) was an American politician who served in the Massachusetts House of Representatives from 1982 to 1992. He was succeeded by Timothy J. Toomey, Jr.

See also
 Massachusetts House of Representatives' 29th Middlesex district

References

Members of the Massachusetts House of Representatives
1940s births
2014 deaths